KGLB (1310 AM) is a radio station licensed to Glencoe, Minnesota. The station, which previously aired an oldies format based in St. Peter, Minnesota, returned to the air on July 15, 2009, with a Classic Country format. The station had been off the air for about a year.

The station was owned by Three Eagles Communications, along with sister stations KEEZ, KYSM-FM, KRBI-FM, and KMKO-FM in the Mankato/St. Peter/New Ulm metropolitan area. It originally held the call sign KRBI, was renamed KGLB on November 1, 2008, renamed KTWN on August 1, 2011, and returned to the KGLB call sign on December 6, 2012.

KRBI 1310 was sold to Northern Lights Broadcasting during the summer of 2008. Northern Lights allowed the station to go dark on the date the sale became official. Northern Lights, the owner of rhythmic-formatted B96 (KTTB), had filed an application to move B96 from Glencoe to Edina to improve the station's coverage over the Twin Cities metropolitan area. Northern Lights moved KGLB from St. Peter to Glencoe with a power of 2,500 days and 270 watts nights, in order to maintain "local service" to Glencoe.

Northern Lights sold the station to Tor Ingstad and licensee Iowa City Broadcasting Company, Inc. for $195,000; the transaction was consummated on July 10, 2013.

References

External links

Radio stations in Minnesota
Radio stations established in 1984
1984 establishments in Minnesota